Donald Graham Smith (born May 9, 1958) is a Canadian former competition swimmer who won a silver medal in the men's 4x100-metre medley relay at the 1976 Summer Olympics in Montreal, Quebec.  He did so alongside teammates Stephen Pickell, Clay Evans and Gary MacDonald. His brother George and sister Becky also competed in swimming.

At the 1978 Commonwealth Games in Edmonton, Alberta, he became the first competitor to win six gold medals at a single Commonwealth Games; he won the 100- and 200-metre breaststroke, 200- and 400-metre individual medleys, and was part of the winning 4x100-metre freestyle and 4x100-metre medley relay teams.  Smith twice broke the world record in the men's 200-metre individual medley (long course).

He also won an NCAA national swimming championship at the University of California, Berkeley.

Smith was inducted into the Alberta Sports Hall of Fame and Museum in 1978.

See also
 List of Commonwealth Games medallists in swimming (men)
 List of Olympic medalists in swimming (men)
 List of University of California, Berkeley alumni
 World record progression 200 metres individual medley

References

 

1958 births
Living people
California Golden Bears men's swimmers
Canadian male breaststroke swimmers
Canadian male medley swimmers
Commonwealth Games gold medallists for Canada
World record setters in swimming
Lou Marsh Trophy winners
Medalists at the 1976 Summer Olympics
Olympic silver medalists for Canada
Olympic swimmers of Canada
Swimmers from Edmonton
Swimmers at the 1976 Summer Olympics
Swimmers at the 1978 Commonwealth Games
Swimmers at the 1979 Pan American Games
World Aquatics Championships medalists in swimming
Pan American Games silver medalists for Canada
Pan American Games bronze medalists for Canada
Olympic silver medalists in swimming
Commonwealth Games medallists in swimming
Pan American Games medalists in swimming
Universiade medalists in swimming
Universiade gold medalists for Canada
Medalists at the 1977 Summer Universiade
Medalists at the 1979 Pan American Games
Medallists at the 1978 Commonwealth Games